is a Japanese manga series written and illustrated by Kore Yamazaki. It is serialized in Mag Garden's Monthly Comic Garden magazine and is licensed in North America by Seven Seas Entertainment. A three-part prequel anime OVA was produced by Wit Studio and an anime television series aired from October 2017 to March 2018. A second original three-part OVA series by Studio Kafka was released in September 2021. A second season also by Studio Kafka is set to premiere in April 2023.

Plot
Having been ostracized by both her relatives and partially by society, orphaned Japanese high school student Chise Hatori decides to sell herself at an auction in order for somebody else to take her in and have a new place to call home. At the auction in London, she is sold for five million pounds to Elias Ainsworth, a seven-foot-tall humanoid with an animal skull for a head. The magus, who seems closer to a demon than human, either brings her the light she desperately seeks or drowns her in ever deeper shadows in her new country, Great Britain. The series deals with a romantic slice-of-life storyline in a surreal and supernatural light.

Characters

A teenage apprentice and future bride of Elias Ainsworth. Her father and brother abandoned the family when she was young, and her mother committed suicide in front of her causing her to feel unwanted by her relatives. She sold herself to slavery, in order for someone to take her in. She is sold for five million Pounds to Elias. He tells her she is a Sleigh Beggy, a special magus who can draw magic from her surroundings and from within herself. However, this severely strains their bodies, making Sleigh Beggys very weak, and fated to die prematurely. Hence, Elias bought her with hopes of preventing her early death in about three years. Her small and fragile state has led others to give her the nicknames of Robin, and Little Bird Mage. She frequently receives gifts that suppress her magic to maintain her health. After being taken in by Elias she starts practicing magic, and finds she has a talent for sleep magic, but can also perform any type of magic at the cost of tremendous strain.

Also known as "Pilum Muralis" (lit. "Wall Spear"), the Child of Thorns, and the Thorn Mage. He is Chise's master and fiancé, once apprenticed to Master Lindenbaum. A being with both fae and human elements, his origins are a mystery. It is hinted that he was born from the shadows of the forest, but his humanlike traits imply he was a mage who dabbled in black magic, consequently losing his humanity and memories. The other faeries see him as an abomination, something he does not mind. Occasionally, he uses glamour spells to hide his animalistic appearance taking on a similar look to people he knows or sees. In the series he first resembles Simon, then Chise, and then an unknown woman. He can summon and control thorns, and transform into shadows. When angry enough, he adopts a more monstrous form consisting of various animal parts, such as a fish tail, wings or a snake body. Lindenbaum calls him a child in regards to Elias' limited understanding and sensations of human emotions. To this end, Elias purchases Chise partially because she is a rare Sleigh Beggy, but also with hope she can teach him about human feelings and behavior. He dislikes children, because they often see through his shadow magic and fear him. The ones that do not fear him ask many questions about him he cannot answer.

Chise's familiar and a Church grim. He was originally a graveyard guard dog, who chased away grave robbers and evil spirits. He was formerly called  and used to be owned by Isabel. He initially thinks of himself as a human, keeping a human form until he later recalls his true identity. He shares a mental link with Chise and considers her a sister. Ruth's dog form resembles an Irish Wolfdog, although this form can change much like Elias, and he sometimes travels in Chise's shadow.

An old acquaintance of Elias. She is a mage and a technician of the Magus Craft.
Her father was a technician of the Magus Craft. Even though her father was a magician, Angelica, who only had the quality of a sorcerer, could not directly learn the ways of her father. She worked hard to find her own method of performing magic. She later married, and had a daughter Althea.
 

A fairy landlady of the house where Elias and Chise reside. Originally a banshee, she is now a silent silkie and takes care of the housekeeping duties in the household. While protecting Chise, she dislikes Simon Kalm the village priest, glaring at him when he enters Elias' house and wrapping her arms around Chise.

Commonly called Lindel, he is Elias's magician master. He lives in the Land of Dragons. Guarding the last sanctuary of dragons, he is the caretaker of the dragon's nest. His title is Echoes: Song of Flowers, and is many centuries old.

A beautiful vampiric faerie who loves men and gives them talent at the cost of dying young. She had strong feelings for an old man named Joel Garland, but denied that they were in love as love would mean his inevitable death. Unfortunately, her presence was already killing him unintentionally at a slow rate. After learning this, Chise created a remedy that allowed them to see each other one last time. After Joel's passing, she tells Chise she will be living in Joel's garden and will not look for more lovers anymore. She later received the name, Redcurrant (レッドカラント Reddokaranto), as Joel and Chise noted her eyes were the same color as the flower in Joel's Garden.

A priest of the local church in the English town occupied by Elias and Chise, and was assigned the task of observing Elias. He has a breathing condition that is treated by Elias's medicine.

He is an alchemist who apparently hates Magi and magicians, but still cares for his apprentice Alice. He was scarred in the face while protecting Alice, and later allowed Cartaphilus to take his left arm as material for an experiment in place of Alice. He later rebels against Cartaphilus, and becomes interested in finding a way to prevent Chise's premature death.

She is Renfred's highly devoted apprentice. A former street urchin, drug abuser and drug seller, Renfred discovered her innate magic potential, and took her in as an apprentice. Despite a few rough meetings with Chise, because of their similar circumstances and having been saved by her, she ends up befriending Chise.

His true identity is "Cartaphilus", but prefers the name  after the young gravedigger he fused with. He is known also as the Wandering Jew, or the "Magician of the Flow". He is a mysterious being that looks like a young boy, but has been around longer than even Elias. He is so old that he even refers to Ainsworth as a "little boy". Long ago, people said that "God's Son" cast an immortal curse on him for mocking him during the crucifixion, (much like Gestas); it's said his immortality will last until Judgement Day. Through this curse he is unable to die, yet his body continuously rots causing perpetual pain and suffering. While he appears mostly human, he uses the body parts of other creatures and often collects fresh pieces for his body. He travels around the world performing gruesome experiments on both living and dead creatures as well as both humans and fae in hopes of creating a body that will not decay or will give him the ability to finally die. He has persisted for so long at this that he has forgotten why he does experiments causing him to bring nothing but suffering and carnage. His one true desire is to be forgiven and live without suffering.

A kind boy rumored to be the son of a witch. He is in charge of digging graves at the village. The villagers disliked him, calling him strange and creepy because of his ability to see fae and speak with the dead. One day, he hears a voice calling for help. He follows the voice and finds Cartaphilus, who looks like a shriveled up corpse. He brings Cartaphilus to his house and attempts to nurse him back to health. Cartaphilus makes Joseph feel needed causing Joseph to grow attached and he asks Cartaphilus to take him away once he is healed. Upon learning Cartaphilus cannot be cured in order to take him away to a better place, a strange fusion is made between the two giving Cartaphilus Joseph's body in order to take him away from his misery. After the fusion however, both enter a state of temporary amnesia. This fusion does not stop the curse from slowly consuming both of them, rotting them from the inside out. Joseph then regains some memory after hearing about Cartaphilus' past. He gets angry for suffering for something he did not do and Cartaphilus forgets what he did.

A mischievous Faerie King and Titania's husband. He resembles a satyr, with hooves and deer antlers.

The Faerie Queen and Oberon's wife. She looks like a beautiful and buxom woman riding a donkey, but can temporarily possess other faeries. She is a proud and very kind motherly figure to Ainsworth and frequently requests he come to live with her in the faerie kingdom. She still considers Ainsworth her child as he is the shadow of nature even though he is mostly a beast. Despite repeated requests from Ainsworth not to, she feels sorry for him and wishes for his happiness because she knows he is not accepted by humans or fae and may very well never find a place in the world.

Titania and Oberon's bodyguard, who dislikes Elias. He is the one giving Silver a new purpose and name (chapter twenty-four).

Introduced by Lindel as his master and teacher. She is older than Lindel and is the person that gave both Lindel and Elias their names.

 
A friend of Chise and the older sister of Ethan. While visiting her grandparents over Christmas she got into an argument with Ethan, in which afterwards, he goes to the woods. Stella frantically went around town looking for him, but she couldn't find him and strangely everybody but her forgot he existed. Then she ran into Chise and Elias, telling them what happened and begging for their help. They agreed to help, then found out that it was Ashen Eye that took Stella's brother. Once they saved Ethan, Stella repays Chise and Elias by baking sweets for them when she makes her monthly visit to her grandparents.

A librarian friend of Chise appeared in The Ancient Magus' Bride: Those Awaiting a Star OVA.

An ancient fae who gives Chise a magical fox skin that she can use to mutate into a were-animal of her choosing. Ashen Eye is spiteful towards humans to the point he will use them to amuse himself.

At first, Chise is the only one who sees or hears Mariel at Seth's auction house. Mariel later appears before Elias and Chise, revealing she's a witch, and that she may have a solution to Chise's curse.

Chise's father. Back in Japan, he kept their neighbors from spying on them until he and his youngest son Fumiki ran away together, leaving Chise and her mother to fend for themselves.

Chise and Fumiki's late mother. Originally before her death, she was kind, loving and soft-spoken; she tried protecting her daughter from the creatures that were drawn to her--but after a while, she grew to hate her own daughter. The stress of having to care for Chise tore her apart and she decided to end her own life by killing herself in front of Chise. It is implied that in the past, Chise's mother had gone through similar things when she was younger but was able to persevere. The stress of dealing with it again alongside raising Chise was what made her susceptible to her manipulation and near strangulation of her daughter. It is through her that Chise inherited the red hair and green eyes.

Chise's younger brother who mysteriously disappeared with his father. Like the rest of his family, he has incredible magical energy that in the same vein as his father created a protective barrier at the family apartment to keep the neighbors away.

Chise's distant aunt through marriage, her husband Shouji forced her to take her in to avoid having a negative reputation and raised her along her two sons Daiki and Koki. However, Akiko was heavily negligent of Chise and was constantly complaining to her husband due to his business trips, leaving him to not deal with the young mage-to-be. Like most humans, Akiko could not see the "neighbors", and thus did not know the torment that Chise went through on a daily basis, instead seeing her as a problem child and a burden.

Akiko's husband, Daiki & Koki's father and Chise's uncle. He's often away on business trips.

Shouji and Akiko's first son, Koki's brother and one of Chise's cousins.

Shouji and Akiko's second son, Daiki's brother and one of Chise's cousins.

Media

Manga
The Ancient Magus' Bride is written and illustrated by Kore Yamazaki. The series was first serialized in Mag Garden's Monthly Comic Blade from November 30, 2013, to September 1, 2014, when the magazine ceased publication. The series was moved to the new Monthly Comic Garden magazine, while also continuing to be released on the Monthly Comic Blade website. Seven Seas Entertainment licensed the series for publication in North America in October 2014.

A drama CD was bundled with the limited edition of the fifth volume, released in March 2016.

Some copies of the English volume 8 were printed with black and white covers instead of color.

The series has been collected into nineteen tankōbon volumes, with seventeen being published in English as of March 7, 2023.

Light novels

Anime

A three-part prequel anime was announced in the fifth volume of the manga. The series is titled . It is directed by Norihiro Naganuma and written by Kore Yamazaki, with scripts by Aya Takaha. Wit Studio produced the animation and Production I.G is credited with planning and production. Hirotaka Katō designed the characters and Bamboo is in charge of the background art. The series' music is composed by Junichi Matsumoto and produced by Flying Dog.

The episodes were bundled with the sixth, seventh and eighth volumes of the manga, between September 10, 2016, March 10, 2017, and September 9, 2017. The first episode was shown in theaters for two weeks, starting on August 13, 2016; the second episode premiered in theaters on February 4, 2017; and the third episode premiered on August 19, 2017. Crunchyroll began streaming the first episode on September 10, 2016.

An anime television series adaptation was announced on March 10, 2017, and aired from October 7, 2017, to March 24, 2018, on MBS, Tokyo MX, BS11 and other Japanese channels. JUNNA performed the opening theme "Here", and Hana Itoki performed the ending theme . Funimation streamed an English dub. The anime adapted the manga till the ninth volume. It later won the best drama award at the 2017 Crunchyroll Anime Awards. Manga Entertainment will distribute the series on home video in the United Kingdom and Ireland.

A second original three-part OVA series titled The Ancient Magus' Bride: The Boy From the West and the Knight of the Mountain Haze was announced in March 2021, with the episodes being bundled with the sixteenth, seventeenth and eighteenth volumes of the manga, released on September 10, 2021, March 10, 2022, and September 10, 2022. The OVA series is animated by Studio Kafka and directed by Kazuaki Terasawa, with scripts by Aya Takaha and Yoko Yonaiyama. Hirotaka Katō returns to design the characters, and Junichi Matsumoto returns to compose the series' music.

A second season was announced on September 5, 2022. Studio Kafka is returning from the OVA to produce the season, with Kazuaki Terasawa returning to direct. Chiaki Nishinaka is joining Aya Takaha and Yoko Yonaiyama in writing the screenplay. Hirotaka Katō and Junichi Matsumoto are also returning as character designer and composer. The opening theme song, "Dear", is again performed by JUNNA. The season is set to premiere on April 6, 2023 on Tokyo MX, BS11, Sun TV, and AT-X.

Reception

Sales
Volume 2 reached the 9th place on the Oricon's weekly manga chart and, as of September 21, 2014, had sold 104,518 copies.

The series had sold half a million copies as of June 2015, 2.5 million copies as of March 2016, and over three million as of September 2016. By December 2017, the series had five million copies in print.

Volume two appeared on The New York Times manga bestsellers list for four weeks, rising to third place for two. Volume three debuted on the list at second place, volume four debuted at first place, and volume five debuted at fourth place.

Critical reception
Reviewing the first volume for Anime News Network, Nick Creamer gave it a grade of A−. He praised the series' art, noting that it "does great work in impressing upon the audience the same sense of wonder Chise experiences throughout. The character designs are expressive and backgrounds ornate". Commenting on the relationship between Chise and Elias, he wrote that "having this story go in a legitimately romantic direction would likely raise thorny issues of power dynamics and consent", but remarked that, as it was, the story "does a commendable job of making both Chise and Elias understandable and likable characters". He concluded his review by writing: "What conflict all these lovely details might be leading towards is a mystery so far, but the execution is so strong that I'm ready to follow wherever it leads." In his review of the second volume, he admitted to coming to an appreciation of the main characters' relationship, writing that "the ambiguities of their relationship actually seem like one more fitting piece of a world where every relationship is ambiguous". He called the series' magic "classic but still refreshing". He also commented that the series' art "remains gorgeous and well-suited to the story all throughout this volume ... the backgrounds are lush and faces expressive, and the whole style has an ornate looseness to it that works perfectly for this kind of fantasy storytelling". He concluded by saying "If you have any appreciation for this style of classic fantasy storytelling, Ancient Magus' Bride is a can't-miss production".

Accolades
The Ancient Magus' Bride ranked second on Takarajimasha's Kono Manga ga Sugoi! list of best manga of 2014 for male readers. The series ranked 36th on the 2014 "Book of the Year" list by the Da Vinci magazine. Da Vinci readers also ranked it second in a poll to determine the series most likely to "make their big break" in 2015. The series ranked first on a poll of 2,360 bookstore employees to determine the 2015's top 15 manga series published in five volumes or less. It was one of fourteen titles nominated for the eighth Manga Taishō awards in 2015. The series ranked second in the first Next Manga Award in the print manga category.

Notes

References

Further reading

External links
  official website 
  at Monthly Comic Blade 
  
  at Seven Seas Entertainment
 

2017 anime television series debuts
2016 anime OVAs
2021 anime OVAs
Comics set in London
Crunchyroll anime
Crunchyroll Anime Awards winners
Dark fantasy anime and manga
Funimation
IG Port franchises
Mag Garden manga
Mystery anime and manga
Production I.G
Seven Seas Entertainment titles
Shōnen manga
Supernatural anime and manga
Television shows set in London
Upcoming anime television series
Wit Studio